Heusweiler (Saarlandic: Heiswiller; older ) is a municipality in the District of Saarbrücken, Saarland, Germany. It is situated approximately 13 km north of Saarbrücken. As of 2019, it has 18,062 inhabitants. Heusweiler is the location of a high power medium wave transmitter, the transmitter Heusweiler.

References

Saarbrücken (district)